Barthélemy, or Barthélémy is a French name, a cognate of Bartholomew. Notable people with this name include:

Given name 
 Barthélemy (explorer), French youth  who accompanied the explorer de La Salle in 1687
 Barthélémy Bisengimana, Congolese chief of staff to President Mobutu Sese Seko of Zaire
 Barthélemy Boganda (1910–1959), politician and advocate for the independence of Oubangui-Chari, which later became the Central African Republic
 Barthélemy d'Herbelot de Molainville (1625–1695), French Orientalist
 Barthélemy Faujas de Saint-Fond (1741–1819), French geologist and traveler
 Barthélemy Hauréau (Jean-Barthélémy) (1812–1896), French historian and writer
 Barthélemy Prosper Enfantin (1796–1864), French social reformer
 Barthélémy Thomas Strafforello (1764–1845), French politician.

Surname or title 
 Anatole Jean-Baptiste Antoine de Barthélemy (1821–1904), French archaeologist and numismatist
 Auguste-Marseille Barthélemy (1796–1867), French satirical poet
 Emmanuel Barthélemy (1820–1855), French revolutionary and political exile
 François-Marie, marquis de Barthélemy (c. 1750–1830), French politician
 Jean-Jacques Barthélemy (1716–1795), French writer and numismatist
 Jules Barthélemy-Saint-Hilaire (1805–1895), French philosopher and statesman
 René Barthélemy, (1889–1954), French engineer, co-inventor of television
 Rances Barthelemy, (born 1986), Cuban boxer
Sidney Barthelemy, (born 1942), 58th Mayor of New Orleans, Louisiana.

See also 
 
 
 Saint Barthélemy, an island of the Leeward group in the Caribbean

References 

French masculine given names
French-language surnames